Magdy Gheriani (born 18 February 1931) is an Egyptian gymnast. He competed in eight events at the 1952 Summer Olympics.

References

External links
 

1931 births
Possibly living people
Egyptian male artistic gymnasts
Olympic gymnasts of Egypt
Gymnasts at the 1952 Summer Olympics